Aaron Wade Taylor (born August 20, 1977), nicknamed Big Country, is a former Major League Baseball relief pitcher for the Seattle Mariners.

Taylor was drafted by the Atlanta Braves in the 11th round of the 1996 Major League Baseball draft and was drafted in the  Rule 5 draft by the Seattle Mariners. He made his debut for the Mariners on September 9, but gave up 4 earned runs in only 1 inning. He made his final appearance on October 2, . On December 20, 2004, Taylor was traded to the Colorado Rockies for Sean Green, but he never pitched a game for the Rockies. In 2006, he played 3 games for the independent Chico Outlaws of the Golden Baseball League.

External links
, or Retrosheet, or Pelota Binaria (Venezuelan Winter League)

1977 births
Living people
Baseball players from Georgia (U.S. state)
Cardenales de Lara players
American expatriate baseball players in Venezuela
Chico Outlaws players
Danville Braves players
Everett AquaSox players
Gulf Coast Braves players
Inland Empire 66ers of San Bernardino players
Macon Braves players
Major League Baseball pitchers
People from Valdosta, Georgia
San Antonio Missions players
Seattle Mariners players
Tacoma Rainiers players
Wisconsin Timber Rattlers players